Hjalmar Alcharoy Zambrano Zambrano (born 23 April 1971) is a retired Ecuadorian footballer (soccer), who played as a midfielder.

International career
He was a member of the Ecuador national football team for three years, and obtained a total number of 5 caps during his career. He made his debut on 24 November 1992 in a friendly against Peru, scoring one goal, after having competed at the 1987 FIFA U-16 World Championship in Canada.

Honours

International
 
 Korea Cup: 1995

References

External links

Info

1971 births
Living people
People from Chone, Ecuador
Association football midfielders
Ecuadorian footballers
Ecuador international footballers
Barcelona S.C. footballers
S.D. Quito footballers
L.D.U. Quito footballers